Naval Submarine Base New London is the primary United States Navy East Coast submarine base, also known as the "Home of the Submarine Force." It is located in Groton, Connecticut directly across the Thames River from its namesake city of New London.

History

In 1868, the State of Connecticut gave the Navy  of land along the Thames River in Groton to build a Naval Station. Due to a lack of federal funding, it was not until 1872 that two brick buildings and a T-shaped pier were constructed and officially declared a Navy Yard.  In 1898, Congress approved a coaling station to be built at the Yard for refueling small naval ships traveling through the waters of New England. The Navy Yard was first used for laying up inactive ships. The Congressional appropriations were small and the Navy had little need for the yard, which was closed from 1898 to 1900 and its personnel reassigned. By 1912, oil replaced coal in warships and again the Yard was scheduled for closure and the land relinquished by the Navy.

Submarine base established
The Navy Yard was spared permanent closure in 1912 by an impassioned plea from Congressman Edwin W. Higgins of Norwich, who was worried about the loss of Federal spending in the region. On 13 October 1915, the monitor , a submarine tender, and four submarines arrived in Groton. Additional submarines and support craft arrived the following year, and the facility was named as the Navy's first submarine base. The first commander of the Yard was retired Commodore Timothy A. Hunt, who was recalled to service. He was living in New Haven, and he used the Central Hotel on State Street, New London when in town to attend to Yard duties on an "as needed" basis. The submarine base is physically located in the Town of Groton, but New London became associated with it because the base had its main offices and housing in New London. Following World War I, the Navy established schools and training facilities at the base.

Wartime expansion
The Base property expanded during the latter part of World War I. Congress approved over a million dollars for Base real estate and facilities expansion. By the end of the war, 81 buildings had been built to support 1,400 men and 20 submarines, although the land expansion was slowed through much of the 1920s. However, the Great Depression of the 1930s saw an expansion and enhancement of the physical plant of the Base. President Franklin D. Roosevelt created a series of Federal Government employment programs that contributed significantly to the Submarine Base. Over 26 high quality warehouses, barracks, and workshops were built at the base under these Federal job-spending programs. The Submarine Force leaped in size, and the Base accommodated thousands of men to serve the growing combat fleet. Immediately after World War II, the Submarine Force was significantly reduced and many submarines were sent into storage. Most of the World War II fleet was sold for scrap metal during the early 1960s.

From 1930 to 1994, the most recognizable structure on the base was the  Escape Training Tank. The Steinke hood was replaced by the Submarine Escape Immersion Equipment in the 2000s.

Submarine school
The New London Base is homeport to 16 attack submarines and full Navy base situated in Groton, Connecticut. The Base is also neighbor to the major submarine construction yard of General Dynamics' Electric Boat Division. All officer and enlisted submariners are stationed at Groton during their training, with the exception of nuclear trained Electronics Technicians (ETs), Electrician's Mates (EMs), and Machinist's Mates (MMs). Enlisted sailors attending sub school will first go through Basic Enlisted Sub School (BESS), an eight-week program that teaches the rigors of undersea life. BESS includes training in shoring, patching leaks and ruptured pipes, firefighting, and boat handling techniques. After BESS, sailors will either go to a boat or to follow-on schools.

It also supports more than 70 tenant commands, including Naval Submarine School (NAVSUBSCOL), Naval Submarine Support Facility (NSSF), three Submarine Squadron staffs, and the housing and support facilities for more than 21,000 civilian workers, active-duty service members, and their families.

Base realignment and proposed closure

On 13 May 2005, the Pentagon recommended that the base be closed. After review, the 2005 Base Realignment and Closure Commission voted on 24 August 2005 to strike New London from the list of possible closures, thus allowing the base to remain open.

Garrison 
Current units stationed at NSBNL include:

 Naval Submarine School
 Submarine Learning Centre
 Naval Branch Health Clinic
 Naval Submarine Medical Research Laboratory
 Naval Undersea Medical Institute
 Navy Information Operations Detachment
 Commander Submarine Group 2
Submarine Squadron 4
Los Angeles-class submarines
 USS Hartford (SSN-768)
 Virginia-class submarines
USS Virginia (SSN-774)
USS New Mexico (SSN-779)
 USS California (SSN-781)
 USS Minnesota (SSN-783)
 USS North Dakota (SSN-784)
 USS Colorado (SSN-788)
 USS Indiana (SSN-789)
 USS South Dakota (SSN-790)
 USS Delaware (SSN-791) – Commissioned 4 April 2020
 USS Vermont (SSN-792) – Commissioned 18 April 2020
 Submarine Development Squadron 12
 Los Angeles-class submarines
 USS Providence (SSN-719)
 USS San Juan (SSN-751)
 USS Toledo (SSN-769)

See also

Atlantic Reserve Fleet, New London
Submarine Force Library and Museum
Naval Submarine Medical Research Laboratory
United States Navy submarine bases

References

External links

NSB New London website
Militarynewcomers
Naval Vessel Register
U.S. Navy Submarine Force Museum — Official home of USS Nautilus (SSN-571)
Navy Basic Enlisted Submarine School

New London
Buildings and structures in Groton, Connecticut
Historic American Engineering Record in Connecticut
Military installations in Connecticut
Military Superfund sites
Buildings and structures in New London County, Connecticut
Superfund sites in Connecticut